The Metulji botnet, discovered in June 2011, is a botnet mainly involved in cyberscamming and denial of service attacks. Before the botnet itself was dismantled, it consisted of over  12 million individual zombie computers infected with the "Butterfly Bot", making it, as of June 2011, the largest known botnet.

It is not known what type of computers are vulnerable, or how to tell if a computer is a part of this botnet.

See also
 Carna botnet
 Command and control (malware)
 Computer worm
 Spambot
 Timeline of notable computer viruses and worms
 Xor DDoS
 Zombie (computer science)
 ZeroAccess botnet

Notes

Internet security
Distributed computing projects
Botnets